Alice Maria Arzuffi (born 19 November 1994) is an Italian professional racing cyclist, who currently rides for UCI Women's Continental Team  in road racing, and UCI Cyclo-cross Team  in cyclo-cross.

Major results

Road

2014
 8th 7-Dorpenomloop Aalburg
2015
 8th Acht van Westerveld
2016
 7th Holland Hills Classic
2017
 6th Giro del Trentino Alto Adige-Südtirol
2018
 4th La Classique Morbihan
 6th Overall Gracia–Orlová
2019
 7th Overall Women's Tour de Yorkshire

Cyclo-cross

2013–2014
 1st Illnau
 2nd Fae' di Oderzo
 3rd Milan
2014–2015
 Giro d'Italia Cross
1st Fiuggi
2nd Rome
2nd Padova
2nd Rossano Veneto
2nd Isola d'Elba
 1st Milan
 2nd National Championships
 3rd Beromünster
2015–2016
 1st  National Under-23 Championships
 Giro d'Italia Cross
1st Rome
1st Fiuggi
 1st Beromünster
 1st Città di Schio
 2nd  UEC European Under-23 Championships
 2nd Illnau
 3rd Fae' di Oderzo
2016–2017
 1st Fae' di Oderzo
 1st Milan
 2nd National Championships
 2nd Woerden
 UCI World Cup
3rd Zeven
2017–2018
 Brico Cross
1st Bredene
 Soudal Classics
2nd Niel
 2nd National Championships
 2nd Milan
 3rd  UEC European Championships
2018–2019
 Superprestige
1st Gavere
2nd Boom
3rd Gieten
 2nd National Championships
 DVV Trophy
2nd Koppenberg
 Brico Cross
2nd Geraardsbergen
2nd Ronse
 2nd Wachtebeke
 UCI World Cup
3rd Tábor
2019–2020
 Superprestige
1st Boom
2nd Gavere
 2nd National Championships
 DVV Trophy
3rd Koppenberg
 3rd Overijse
2020–2021
 1st  National Championships
2021–2022
 2nd San Colombano

See also
 2014 Astana BePink Women's Team season

References

External links
 

1994 births
Living people
Italian female cyclists
Cyclo-cross cyclists
People from Seregno
Cyclists from the Province of Monza e Brianza
21st-century Italian women